Vallecitos de Zaragoza is a town in Guerrero, Mexico.

References

Populated places in Guerrero